Zarrin Rud (formerly Zarrinabad, also Romanized as Zarrīnābād and Zīrīnābād; also, Zarrīn Ābād Bīnrīneh Rood) is a city in, and the capital of, Bizineh Rud District of Khodabandeh County, Zanjan province, Iran. At the 2006 census, its population was 4,956 in 1,145 households. The following census in 2011 counted 5,530 people in 1,352 households. The latest census in 2016 showed a population of 5,664 people in 1,594 households.

References 

Khodabandeh County

Cities in Zanjan Province

Populated places in Zanjan Province

Populated places in Khodabandeh County